Dois Irmãos is a municipality in the state of Rio Grande do Sul, Brazil. Its original German name was Baumschneis.

Publishing 
The Catholic subscription book club Minha Biblioteca Católica was created there.

See also
List of municipalities in Rio Grande do Sul

References

Municipalities in Rio Grande do Sul